Soft plastic may refer to:

Plastics that may be scrunched up in the hand, as a crude measure for plastic recycling.
Soft plastic bait, used in fishing.